Commatarcha acidodes is a moth in the Carposinidae family. It was described by Alexey Diakonoff in 1989. It is found in Yunnan, China.

References

Natural History Museum Lepidoptera generic names catalog

Carposinidae
Moths described in 1989